Andreas Neufert (born August 16, 1961) is a German art historian.

Biography
On his father's side Neufert is related to the architect Ernst Neufert (1900–1986), to the philologist Friedrich Vollmer (1867–1923), to Anna Maria Lasinsky (Freiin von Knapp) (1782–1839) the German-Polish romantic poet, and to the German-Polish Lasinsky family. On his mother's side he has German-English ancestors in the families Garrels and Russell.

Neufert studied art history, philosophy and literature at the universities of Munich, Vienna and Paris, and took his doctorate at the Witten/Herdecke University. His dissertation about the Austrian-Mexican surrealist Wolfgang Paalen is mainly concerned with the aspect of the Viennese philosophical tradition of (logical positivism, Ludwig Wittgenstein, Ernest Mach). It was published 1999 under the title Im Inneren des Wals at Springer-Verlag Wien/New York. 1993/94 he worked as guest curator at the Museum Moderner Kunst – Stiftung Ludwig, Vienna, and 1994 as co-curator of the retrospective exhibition Wolfgang Paalen in the Museo de Arte Carrillo Gil, Mexico City; Neufert became a regular guest-curator at the MACG, Mexiko (1994–98) and realized f.e. exhibitions like Recuerdo del Paraiso eternal, André Breton. He has extensively researched the life of Wolfgang Paalen, the surrealist artist and thinker. 2015 he published the 700 pages biography on Paalen Auf Liebe und Tod (Parthas Berlin). In 2019 he curated a Wolfgang Paalen Retrospective Exhibition for the Österreichische Galerie Belvedere in Vienna.

Neufert has three children and lives with his family in Berlin-Schöneberg and Bork am See (Brandenburg). Since 2002 he has worked as a freelance curator and author.

Selected works 
 Engagement und Distanz. Aspekte einer Sammlung. Edition van de Loo, München, 1992, (collection of 35 Essays by Andreas Neufert about Pierre Alechinsky, Günter Brus, Jean Dubuffet, Asger Jorn, Henri Michaux, Arnulf Rainer, Antonio Saura, Wols u.a.) (In German)
 Wolfgang Paalen. Im Inneren des Wals. – Monografie/Schriften/Oevrekatalog. Springer, Wien/ New York 1999. (In German)
 Aby Warburg’s Mnemosyne Atlas, Art versus Psychology – Psychology versus Art. in: (In)disciplinas: Estética e Historia del Arte en el Cruce de los Discursos, XXII. Coloquio Internacional de Historia del Arte, Hrsg.v. Lucero Enriquez, Universidad Nacional Autonoma de Mexico, Istituto de Investigaciones Esteticas, México, 1999, pp. 281–297
 Celos, miedo y delirio en el signo de la Luna. Essay, in: Alice Rahon. Una Surrealista en Mexico, Ausstellungskatalog Museo de Arte Moderno, Mexico-City, 2009, pp. 90–117 (In Spanish)
 The Totem as Sphinx, in: Dawn Adès, Rita Eder, and Graciela Speranza, Surrealism in Latin America, Vivismo Muerto, Getty Research Institute (Issues & Debates), Los Angeles, 2012, pp. 111–129
 Auf Liebe und Tod. Das Leben des Surrealisten Wolfgang Paalen (A Matter of Life and Death. The Life of the Surrealist Wolfgang Paalen), Berlin: Parthas, 2015 (In German)

References 

This article incorporates translated material from the German Wikipedia article.

External links 
 Website of Andreas Neufert
 Beta Worldcat Archives of Getty Research Institute Debates on Surrealism in Latin America
 Lecture of Andreas Neufert: The Totem as Sphinx, Wolfgang Paalen´s urgent Illuminations during his Voyage into Exile 1939 (Symposion Vivísimo Muerto: Debates on Surrealism in Latin America of the Getty Research Center, Los Angeles)
 Discussion with Dawn Ades, Andreas Neufert and Daniel Garza Usabiaga about Wolfgamg Paalen
 Booktrailer: Andreas Neufert, Auf Liebe und Tod
 The official website about Wolfgang Paalen and Succession Wolfgang Paalen

1961 births
Living people
German contemporary artists
German art historians
Writers from Munich
Academic staff of the Ludwig Maximilian University of Munich
German male non-fiction writers